Azubuike Cosmas Sunday Oliseh Jr. (born 18 November 1978) is a Nigerian former football midfielder. He last played for Ermis Aradippou in the Cypriot First Division. He is the younger brother of retired Nigeria captain Sunday Oliseh and the older brother of the former AS Nancy and QPR midfielder Egutu Oliseh; another brother is Churchill Oliseh and his nephew is Sekou Oliseh.

Azubuike joined his compatriots Celestine Babayaro and James Obiorah at Anderlecht, as a 16-year-old. Looking for regular first team action, Oliseh was loaned out to Royal Antwerp for the 1998–99 season, before moving to the Dutch Eredivisie the following year.

References

1978 births
Living people
Nigerian footballers
Association football midfielders
Nigeria international footballers
Olympic footballers of Nigeria
Footballers at the 2000 Summer Olympics
Belgian Pro League players
Eredivisie players
Veikkausliiga players
Cypriot First Division players
AEK Larnaca FC players
R.S.C. Anderlecht players
RBC Roosendaal players
FC Utrecht players
FC Jokerit players
K.S.V. Roeselare players
Oud-Heverlee Leuven players
Ermis Aradippou FC players
Expatriate footballers in Cyprus
Expatriate footballers in Belgium
Nigerian expatriates in the Netherlands
Expatriate footballers in Finland
Nigerian expatriates in Belgium
Expatriate footballers in the Netherlands
Nigerian expatriates in Finland
Sportspeople from Warri